Trichohyllisia is a genus of beetles in the family Cerambycidae, containing the following species:

 Trichohyllisia allardi Breuning, 1958
 Trichohyllisia strandi Breuning, 1942

References

Agapanthiini